The Renunciation is a 1909 silent short film directed by D. W. Griffith and starring Mary Pickford. It was produced and distributed by the Biograph Company.

Cast
Mary Pickford - Kittie Ryan
Anthony O'Sullivan - Steve Ryan, Kittie's Uncle
James Kirkwood - Joe Fielding
Harry Solter - Sam Walters
Billy Quirk - Kittie's Fiance

other cast
Edwin August
Arthur V. Johnson
Wilfred Lucas
W. Chrystie Miller

References

External links
 The Renunciation at IMDb.com

The Renunciation available for free download at Internet Archive

1909 films
American silent short films
Biograph Company films
Films directed by D. W. Griffith
American black-and-white films
Articles containing video clips
1900s American films